This is a list of earthquakes in Canada.

List 

Abbreviations used:

See also
Hydraulic fracturing in Canada

References

External links
Natural Resources Canada Earthquakes Canada
Earthquakes Canada Recent earthquakes

 
Earthquakes
Canada
Lists of disasters in Canada